Nationality words link to articles with information on the nation's poetry or literature (for instance, Irish or France).

Events
 Laurence Eusden made British Poet Laureate

Works published
 Joseph Addison:
 Poems on Several Occasions, published this year, although the book states "1719"
The Resurrection, Latin poetry by Addison with an English translation attributed to Nicholas Amhurst
 Nicholas Amhurst
 Protestant Popery; or, The Convocation (part of the Bangorian Controversy)
 See The Resurrection, above
 Cotton Mather, Psalterium Americanum: The Book of Psalms in a Translation Exactly Conformed unto the Original, but All in Blank Verse, a translation in blank verse, with his analysis of poetry, English Colonial America
 Lady Mary Wortley Montagu, "Constantinople", circulated privately
 Alexander Pope, translator, Homer's Iliad, Volume IV (Books 13–16) this year, preceded by Volume I (Books 1–4) in 1715, Volume II (Books 5–8) in 1716, Volume III (Books 9–12) in 1717 and to be followed by Volume V (Books 17–21) and Volume VI (Books 22–24), both in 1720
 Matthew Prior, Alma; or, The Progress of the Mind
 Allan Ramsay, Scots Songs (see also Scots Songs 1719)
 John Wilmot, Earl of Rochester, Remains of the Right Honourable John, Earl of Rochester. Being Satyrs, Songs, and Poems; Never before Published. From a Manuscript found in a Gentleman's Library that was Contemporary with him, London: Printed for Tho. Dryar & sold by T. Harbin, W. Chetwood & the booksellers of London & Westminster, posthumous

Births
Death years link to the corresponding "[year] in poetry" article:
 November 28 – Hedvig Charlotta Nordenflycht (died 1763), Swedish poet, feminist and salon-hostess
 date unknown – Ramprasad Sen (died 1775), Shakta poet of Bengal

Deaths
Birth years link to the corresponding "[year] in poetry" article:
 February 18 – Peter Anthony Motteux (born 1663), English playwright, translator, editor, author and poet
 May 22 – Gaspard Abeille (born 1648), French lyric and tragic poet
 October 24 – Thomas Parnell (born 1679), Irish poet and clergyman, member of the Scriblerus Club
 December 6 – Nicholas Rowe (born 1674), English poet and dramatist
 date unknown – Wu Li (born 1632), Chinese landscape painter and poet

See also

Poetry
List of years in poetry
List of years in literature
 18th century in poetry
 18th century in literature
 Augustan poetry
 Scriblerus Club

Notes

 "A Timeline of English Poetry" Web page of the Representative Poetry Online Web site, University of Toronto

18th-century poetry
Poetry